Fraser Malcolm McLachlan (born 9 November 1982) is an English former footballer who played as a midfielder.

McLachlan began his career in the Football League at Stockport County having joined through the academy. After a loan spell in the Conference for Northwich Victoria, McLachlan moved to Mansfield Town in 2005, before being signed by Sammy McIlroy for Morecambe in March 2006. McLachlan initially moved on loan, making the deal permanent by signing a two-year contract in summer 2006. He missed most of the 2007–08 season because of a broken leg sustained in a League Cup tie with Preston North End. Due to this injury he was released by Morecambe at the end of his contract in May 2010.

He joined Colwyn Bay for the 2010/11 season. In July 2012 he moved to Nantwich Town. 

During the end of his football career McLachlan trained as a chartered accountant.

References

External links

1982 births
Living people
People from Knutsford
English footballers
Association football midfielders
Stockport County F.C. players
Northwich Victoria F.C. players
Mansfield Town F.C. players
Morecambe F.C. players
Nantwich Town F.C. players
English Football League players
National League (English football) players
Colwyn Bay F.C. players
Sportspeople from Cheshire